Jim and Mark Fox were two African-American men who were murdered in Louisville, Mississippi, in 1927.
On June 13, 1927, a mob of 1,000 white men from Louisville lynched two African-Americans, Jim and Mark Fox. In the aftermath of the Great Mississippi Flood of 1927, the Fox brothers were working in or for a Red Cross camp, and got into an argument with a white sawmill superintendent, allegedly killing him. The argument apparently concerned work hours. The two brothers were seized by a crowd and paraded through Louisville; then they were tied to a telephone pole, doused in gasoline, and burned alive. An onlooker who tried to help them was pulled away by the crowd.

References

External links

1927 in Mississippi
1927 murders in the United States
Deaths by person in Mississippi
People murdered in Mississippi
Lynching deaths in Mississippi
Racially motivated violence against African Americans
Murdered African-American people
Race-related controversies in the United States